Below is the order of battle for the Canton Operation, October to December 1938 during the Second Sino-Japanese War.

Imperial Japanese Army 

21st Army - Lt. Gen. Motoo Furusho [8] 
 5th Division - Lt. Gen. Rikichi Ando [8]
 9th Infantry Brigade
 11th Infantry Regiment
 41st Infantry Regiment
 21st Infantry Brigade
 21st Infantry Regiment
 42nd Infantry Regiment
 5th Field Artillery Regiment
 5th Cavalry Regiment
 5th Engineer Regiment
 5th Transport Regiment
 18th Division - Lt. Gen. Seiichi Kunou [8]
 23rd Infantry Brigade
 55th Infantry Regiment
 56th Infantry Regiment
 35th Infantry Brigade
 114th Infantry Regiment
 124th Infantry Regiment
 22nd Cavalry Battalion
 18th Mountain Artillery Regiment
 12th Military Engineer Regiment
 12th Transport Regiment
 104th Division - Lt. Gen. Toshio Miyake [8]
 107th Infantry Brigade
 108th Infantry Regiment
 170th Infantry Regiment
 132nd Infantry Brigade
 137th Infantry Regiment
 161st Infantry Regiment
 104th Field Artillery Regiment
 104th Cavalry Regiment
 104th Engineer Regiment
 104th Transport Regiment

Forces directly under 21st Army:
 3rd Independent Machinegun Battalion (独立機関銃第三大隊)
 6th Independent Machinegun Battalion (独立機関銃第六大隊)
 21st Independent Machinegun Battalion (独立機関銃第二十一大隊)
 11th Independent Light Armored Car Company (独立軽装甲車第十一中隊)
 51st Independent Light Armored Car Company (独立軽装甲車第五十一中隊)
 52nd Independent Light Armored Car Company (独立軽装甲車第五十二中隊)
 111th Mountain Artillery Regiment (山砲兵第百十一聯隊)
 10th Independent Mountain Artillery Regiment (独立山砲兵第十聯隊)
 1st Heavy Field Artillery Brigade (野戦重砲兵第一旅団)
 2nd Mortar Battalion (迫撃第二大隊)
 21st Mortar Battalion (迫撃第二十一大隊)
 11th Independent Heavy Siege Artillery Battalion (独立攻城重砲兵第十一大隊)
 1st Independent Heavy Mortar Battalion (独立臼砲第一大隊)
 2nd Independent Heavy Mortar Battalion (独立臼砲第二大隊)
 3rd Division's 6th and 7th Field Anti-Aircraft Batteries (第三師団第六、第七野戦高射砲隊)
 3rd Division's 8th and 9th Field Anti-Aircraft Batteries (第三師団第八、第九野戦高射砲隊)
 1st Division's 6th and 8th Field Anti-Aircraft Batteries (第一師団第六、第八野戦高射砲隊)
 5th Division's 2nd Field Anti-Aircraft Battery (第五師団第二野戦高射砲隊)
 20th Division's 2nd Field Anti-Aircraft Battery (第二十師団第二野戦高射砲隊)
 1st Independent Balloon Company (独立気球第一中隊)
 15th Independent Engineer Regiment (独立工兵十五聯隊)
 8th Signal Communication Unit (第八通信隊)
 6th Field Meteorological Unit (第六野戦気象隊)
 3rd Field Survey Unit (第三野戦測量隊)

4th Flight Group - Major Gen. Tomo Fujita [8][2] (Formed  on September 19, 1938, under the 21st Army) 
 64th Hiko Sentai - Major Tamiya Teranishi,[2][3] (Base: Ertaokou 8/38 – 11/38)
 1st Chutai -  Captain Mitsugu Sawada
 Nakajima Ki-27 fighter aircraft
 2nd Chutai -  Captain Tsuguroku Nakao
 Kawasaki Ki-10 fighter aircraft
 Nakajima Ki-27 fighter aircraft
 27th Hiko Sentai - ? [2][3]
 1st Chutai - ?
 Light bomber - ?
 31st Hiko Sentai - ? (Base: Canton 11/38 – ) [2][3]
 Light bomber unit. 
 1st Aviation Corps (reconnaissance aircraft)[2]
 94th Flight Group [2]
 97th Flight Group [2]
 3rd Flying Field Squadron [2]
 1st Field Operation Flying Field team.[2]

Notes:
 21st Army formed on September 19, 1938, and attacks Guangzhou October 12, 1938. [2]

Tactical Organization of the 21st Army 

21st Army
 Oikawa Detachment (及川支隊)
 9th Infantry Brigade (Detached from 5th Division)
 11th Infantry Regiment 
 5th Engineer Regiment (Detached from 5th Division)
 1st Company
 Forces under Oikawa Detachment:
 52nd Independent Light Armoured Car Company
 10th Independent Mountain Artillery Regiment (1 Battalion)
 1st Battalion
 15th Independent Engineer Regiment
 18th Division
 23rd Infantry Brigade
 55th Infantry Regiment
 56th Infantry Regiment
 35th Infantry Brigade
 114th Infantry Regiment
 124th Infantry Regiment (Detached except for 3rd Battalion)
 3rd Battalion
 22nd Cavalry Battalion
 18th Mountain Artillery Regiment
 12th Military Engineer Regiment
 12th Transport Regiment
 Forces under 18th Division:
 3rd Independent Machinegun Battalion
 21st Independent Machinegun Battalion
 11th Independent Light Armoured Car Company
 51st Independent Light Armoured Car Company
 111th Mountain Artillery Regiment
 2nd Mortar Battalion
 2nd Independent Heavy Mortar Battalion
 104th Division
 107th Infantry Brigade (108th Infantry Regiment remained in Manchuria)
 170th Infantry Regiment
 132nd Infantry Brigade (161st Infantry Regiment remained in Manchuria)
 137th Infantry Regiment
 104th Field Artillery Regiment (2 Battalions remained in Manchuria)
 104th Cavalry Regiment (1 Battalion remained in Manchuria)
 104th Engineer Regiment
 104th Transport Regiment
 Forces under 104th Division:
 124th Infantry Regiment (Detached from 18th Division, 2 Battalions)
 1st Battalion
 2nd Battalion
 6th Independent Machinegun Battalion
 5th Field Artillery Regiment (1 Battalion)
 2nd Battalion
 10th Independent Mountain Artillery Regiment (2 Battalions)
 2nd Battalion
 3rd Battalion
 21st Mortar Battalion (1 Company)
 1st Company
 11th Independent Heavy Siege Artillery Battalion
 5th Division
 9th Infantry Brigade
 41st Infantry Regiment
 21st Infantry Brigade
 21st Infantry Regiment
 42nd Infantry Regiment
 5th Field Artillery Regiment (2 Battalions)
 1st Battalion
 3rd Battalion
 5th Cavalry Regiment
 5th Engineer Regiment (Except for 1st Company)
 5th Transport Regiment
 Forces under 5th Division:
 21st Mortar Battalion (3 Companies)
 2nd Company
 3rd Company
 4th Company
 1st Independent Heavy Mortar Battalion
 3rd Division's 8th Field Anti-Aircraft Battery
 21st Army Direct Control
 1st Heavy Field Artillery Brigade
 3rd Division's 6th, 7th and 9th Field Anti-Aircraft Batteries
 1st Independent Balloon Company

Imperial Japanese Navy 

5th Fleet - Vice Admiral Kōichi Shiozawa (塩澤中将)
 9th Cruiser Division - Vice Admiral Kōichi Shiozawa (塩澤中将)
 Cruiser Myōkō (妙高) (Flagship)
 Light Cruiser Tama (多摩)
 10th Cruiser Division - Rear Admiral Seiichiro Fujimori (藤森少将)
 Light Cruiser Tenryū (天龍)
 Light Cruiser Tatsuta (龍田)
 8th Cruiser Division - Rear Admiral Jisaburo Ozawa (小澤少将)
 Light Cruiser Kinu (鬼怒)
 Light Cruiser Yura (由良)
 Light Cruiser Naka (那珂)
 2nd Torpedo Squadron
 Light Cruiser Jintsū (神通)
 8th Destroyer Division
 Destroyer Amagiri (天霧)
 Destroyer Yūgiri (夕霧)
 Destroyer Asagiri (朝霧)
 12th Destroyer Division
 Destroyer Shirakumo (白雲)
 Destroyer Murakumo (叢雲)
 Destroyer Shinonome (東雲)
 Destroyer Usugumo (薄雲)
 5th Torpedo Squadron
 Light Cruiser Nagara (長良)
 16th Destroyer Division
 Destroyer Fuyō (芙蓉)
 Destroyer Asagao (朝顔)
 Destroyer Karukaya (刈萱)
 23rd Destroyer Division
 Destroyer Kikuzuki (菊月)
 Destroyer Mochizuki (望月)
 Destroyer Mikazuki (三日月)
 Destroyer Yūzuki (夕月)
 First Carrier Division
 Aircraft Carrier Kaga (加賀)
 29th Destroyer Division
 Destroyer Oite (追風)
 Destroyer Hayate (疾風)
 Second Carrier Division
 Aircraft Carrier Sōryū (蒼龍)
 Light Aircraft Carrier Ryūjō (龍驤)
 30th Destroyer Division
 Destroyer Mutsuki (睦月)
 Destroyer Mochizuki (望月)
 Destroyer Kisaragi (如月)
 Destroyer Yayoi (弥生)
 Second Base Force
 14th Air Group
 Takao Air Group
 Seaplane Tender Chitose (千歳)
 Seaplane Tender Kamikawa Maru (神川丸)
 3rd Destroyer Division
 Destroyer Shimakaze (島風)
 Destroyer Shiokaze (汐風)
 Destroyer Nadakaze (灘風)
 1st Gunboat Division
 Special Gunboat Shuri Maru (首里丸)
 Special Gunboat Nagatoshiyama Maru (長壽山丸)
 Special Gunboat Nagashiroyama Maru (長白山丸)
 1st Combined Air Group
 Additional Units:
 11th Minesweeper Division
 Minesweeper No. 16 (掃十六)
 Minesweeper No. 14 (掃十四)
 Minesweeper No. 15 (掃十五)
 Minesweeper No. 13 (掃十三)
 Minesweeper No. 18 (掃十八)
 Minesweeper No. 17 (掃十七)

China

Canton Area Defense October 1938 [1]

12th Army Group - Yu Han-mou [1]
 62nd Corps - Chang Ta
 151st Division - Mo His-teh
 152nd Division - Chen Chang
 63rd Corps - Chang Jui-kuei
 153rd Division - Chang Jui-kuei
 154th Division - Liang Shih-chi
 65th Corps - Li Chen-chiu
 156th Division - Li Chiangi
 157th Division - Huang Tao
 158th Division - Tseng Yu-chiang
 9th Separate Brigade - Li Chen-liang
 20th Separate Brigade - Chen-liang
 Humen Fortress Command - Chen Tse

Navy[1]
 River Defense Command - ?
 Haimen Fortress
 Pearl River flotilla
 Shao-ho
 Hai-chou
 Hai-hu
 Hai-ou

Airforce[1]
Kwang tung Air Defense command - ? (3 x 75mm AA batteries, 20 lesser caliber AA batteries, 4 searchlights )
 41st AAA Regt.
 1 battery ? mm (Humen Fortress)
 ?
 45th AAA Regt.
 2  76.2mm AA batteries (Canton)
 ?
 3rd Searchlight detachment
 4 searchlights

Sources 

[1] Hsu Long-hsuen and Chang Ming-kai, History of The Sino-Japanese War (1937–1945) 2nd Ed., 1971. Translated by Wen Ha-hsiung, Chung Wu Publishing; 33, 140th Lane, Tung-hwa Street, Taipei, Taiwan Republic of China.

[3] Sino-Japanese Air War 1937-45 

[4] Madej, W. Victor Japanese Armed Forces Order of Battle, 1937-1945 [2 vols]
Allentown, PA: 1981

March 1938
2nd Carrier Division
RYUJO (CF Toshihiko Odawara)
 F     9 Mitsubishi A5M
 DB   15 D1A1
 SORYU
 F    18 A5M & A4N1
 DB   27 DA2
 TB   12 B4Y1

References

Citations

Bibliography 

 
 

Guangdong
Guangdong